The beach volleyball tournaments at the 2003 Pan American Games were held 2−9 August 2003 in Santo Domingo, Dominican Republic.

Men's competition

Women's competition

See also
 Volleyball at the 2003 Pan American Games

References
 
 
 Results at Buzzle 

Events at the 2003 Pan American Games
2003
Pan American Games